Ceryx sambavana is a moth of the subfamily Arctiinae. It was described by George Hampson.

References

Ceryx (moth)